Ivan Ihorovych Pitsan (born 19 January 1990) is a Ukrainian professional football goalkeeper who plays for Prykarpattia Ivano-Frankivsk.

He is the product of Youth Sportive School in his native city Kalush and UFK Lviv. His first trainer was Ihor Vasylkiv. Pitsan was the member of different Ukrainian national youth football teams.

References

External links 
 
 

1990 births
Living people
People from Kalush, Ukraine
Ukrainian footballers
Association football goalkeepers
FC Karpaty Lviv players
FC Prykarpattia Ivano-Frankivsk (2004) players
FC Karpaty-2 Lviv players
FC Sambir players
FC Lviv players
FC Dinamo Batumi players
FC Stal Alchevsk players
FC Stal Kamianske players
FC Obolon-Brovar Kyiv players
FC Kalush players
FC Prykarpattia Ivano-Frankivsk (1998) players
Ukrainian First League players
Ukrainian Second League players
Ukrainian Amateur Football Championship players
Ukrainian expatriate footballers
Expatriate footballers in Georgia (country)
Ukrainian expatriate sportspeople in Georgia (country)
Sportspeople from Ivano-Frankivsk Oblast